The Irisbus Citelis is a low-floor city bus produced by Irisbus from 2005 to 2013 when it was replaced in production by Iveco Bus Urbanway.

Production and operation 
It was introduced in 2005 to replace the Agora. Citelis models use Euro 4, Euro 5 & EEV engines. The buses can also be built as trolleybuses, utilising overhead electrical wires for their power supply instead of fuel. Trolleybus version of Citelis is also known as Škoda 24Tr Irisbus (12m) or Škoda 25Tr Irisbus (18m), especially in Eastern Europe.

Transport
Citelis vehicles were introduced in 2007 on Bucharest's trolleybus network run by STB and in 2006 or 2007 in Riga, capital of Latvia, in which they are owned by Rīgas Satiksme. They are also used by the RATP in Paris, Germany's VER, in Brno and Prague, Czech Republic, by ATM in Milan, by ATAC in Rome, by Strætó bs in Reykjavík, by EMT-Palma in Mallorca Spain, in Nur-Sultan, Kazakhstan, TEC in Belgium, in Iceland, in Plovdiv, Bulgaria by Hebros Bus, in Greece by OASA and OASTH, in Varna, Bulgaria by Transtriumph Holding and by DPMK in Košice and from 14.4.2011 also in SAD Trnava in Trnava, In 2012. year JGSP Novi Sad purchased 5 Irisbus Citelis 12 CNG models.

A Citelis 18 CNG chassis was converted to right-hand drive and bodied by Custom Coaches in 2008–2009. It is now being operated by Path Transit, who is one of three contractors that operates buses under the Transperth brand name in Perth, Western Australia.

See also 

 List of buses

Trolleybuses
Citelis
Articulated buses
Midibuses
Low-floor buses
Vehicles introduced in 2005